Jeffrey A. Crossman (born February 21, 1972) is an American attorney who is the Member of the Ohio House of Representatives from the 15th District in Cuyahoga County. Crossman grew up in Wickliffe, Ohio and graduated from Wickliffe High School. Crossman previously served as a member of the Parma City Council. Crossman has travelled to El Salvador to volunteer with ASAPROSAR, a non-governmental organization that provides health, education, environment and economic development programs.

Crossman was the Democratic nominee in the 2022 Ohio Attorney General election, losing in a lanslide.

Ohio House of Representatives

Election
After incumbent State Representative Nick Celebrezze unexpectedly announced that he would not run for reelection in the 15th District, Crossman, then a member of the Parma City Council, was selected to replace him on the ballot as the Democratic nominee. Crossman was elected in the general election on November 6, 2018, winning 56 percent of the vote over 44 percent of Republican candidate.  In the 2020 election, Crossman was one of only a few Democratic candidates to win a Statehouse seat despite Donald Trump winning his Statehouse District.

Work in the Ohio House 
During his time in the Ohio House, Crossman has served on the following committees: Civil Justice, Criminal Justice, Financial Institutions, Public Utilities, and Ways and Means. Crossman was also one of the key figures in removing former Ohio House Speaker Larry Householder after the Federal government indicted Householder for his role in securing a bailout for First Energy Corp. in exchange for millions of dollars in alleged bribes.  As a result, Householder became the first member of the Ohio General Assembly to have been expelled since the Civil War.

Election history

References

1972 births
21st-century American politicians
Cleveland–Marshall College of Law alumni
Living people
Crossman, Jeffrey
University of Akron alumni
University of Mount Union alumni